OpenBIOS is a project aiming to provide free and open source implementations of Open Firmware. It is also the name of such an implementation.

Most of the implementations provided by OpenBIOS rely on additional lower-level firmware for hardware initialization, such as coreboot or Das U-Boot.

Provided implementations

Open Firmware 

Open Firmware implements the IEEE 1275-1994 standard. Open Firmware was released by the company Firmworks. The principal architect of Open Firmware, Mitch Bradley, is chairman of the Open Firmware Working Group and president and founder of Firmworks. The OLPC XO-1 laptop uses the Open Firmware implementation.
It supports the x86, PowerPC, and ARM architectures, and is released under the terms of a BSD style license.

SmartFirmware 

SmartFirmware includes a C to FCode compiler. It is made by CodeGen, Inc.
It is written in ANSI C and supports the x86, PowerPC, SPARC, ARM, MIPS architectures.

OpenBOOT 

OpenBOOT was released by Sun Microsystems.  It supports the sun4v architecture.

OpenBIOS 
OpenBIOS is portable and licensed under the GPL. It is produced by the OpenBIOS project.

SLOF 

Slimline Open Firmware is produced by IBM, and is released under a BSD style license.
It supports the PowerPC architecture.

See also 

 Coreboot

References

External links
 
 SmartFirmware source code

Free BIOS implementations
Firmware
Custom firmware
Software related to embedded Linux